Pedro Miguel Fonte Boa Santos (born 9 July 1983 in Póvoa de Varzim) is a Portuguese professional footballer who plays as a central defender.

References

External links

1983 births
Living people
People from Póvoa de Varzim
Sportspeople from Porto District
Portuguese footballers
Association football defenders
Liga Portugal 2 players
Campeonato de Portugal (league) players
Varzim S.C. players
C.D. Trofense players
F.C. Penafiel players
Académico de Viseu F.C. players
S.C. Salgueiros players
A.D. Sanjoanense players
SC Mirandela players